is a Japanese international school in Wexham, Buckinghamshire, 20 miles to the west of London. It educates 59 students aged between 15 and 18 years. It is affiliated with Teikyo University, and the Japanese government classifies the school as a Shiritsu zaigai kyoiku shisetsu (私立在外教育施設) or an overseas branch of a Japanese private school.

History
The school opened in April 1989, and occupies Fulmer Grange.

As of 2013 it had 72 students, all from Japan, including 48 boys and 24 girls. Of them, 44 boys and 17 girls were boarders.

Campus
The campus is located north of Slough, and west of London. It is in proximity to Eton College and Windsor Castle. The school includes an indoor swimming pool, an IT room, a theatre, and a turfed ground. Its students live in single-room dormitories.

See also

 Japanese School in London
 Japanese community in the United Kingdom
 Japanese students in the United Kingdom
 Japan–United Kingdom relations

British international schools in Japan:
 The British School in Tokyo

References

External links

 Teikyo School United Kingdom
 Teikyo School United Kingdom 
 Teikyo School United Kingdom (Archive)

Boarding schools in Buckinghamshire
Private schools in Buckinghamshire
Japanese international schools in the United Kingdom
Shiritsu zaigai kyōiku shisetsu in Europe
1989 establishments in England
Educational institutions established in 1989